Mikhail Fyodorovich Vilkov (born 10 July 1979) is a Russian former professional football referee.

He was a FIFA referee from 2012 to 2018, he was not included in the FIFA International Referees List for 2019 or 2020. On 19 April 2021, the Referee Committee of the Russian Football Union announced that he has been banned from refereeing for life.

He played football in the Russian Amateur Football League from 1997 to 1999.

References 

1979 births
Living people
Sportspeople from Nizhny Novgorod
Russian footballers
Russian football referees
Association footballers not categorized by position